Setoguchi is a Japanese surname, meaning "mouth of the channel". People with this surname include:
, Japanese composer and conductor
Devin Setoguchi (born 1987), Canadian ice hockey player

Fictional characters with this surname include:
Hina Setoguchi, a main character in 2016 Japanese animated film Suki ni Naru Sono Shunkan o

See also
Setoguchi Station, railway station in Seto, Aichi Prefecture, Japan
Setouchi (disambiguation), also a Japanese surname and placename
58622 Setoguchi, minor planet discovered in 1997

References

Japanese-language surnames